Parma Calcio 2022, commonly known as Parma, is an Italian women's association football club based in Parma, Emilia-Romagna. It was originally founded in July 2015 as part of the male parent club's reformation from bankruptcy and played in the lower regional divisions. In June 2022 Parma's American owners bought out Empoli Ladies, obtaining a place in the full-time professional Serie A and reconstituting themselves as Parma Calcio 2022.

Stadium
In August 2022 Parma announced that all the women's team's home matches will be staged at the Stadio Ennio Tardini.

Players

Current squad

Former players

References

External links 
 Official website

Parma
Football clubs in Emilia-Romagna
Association football clubs established in 2022
2022 establishments in Italy
Women